The 1892 Colorado Silver and Gold football team was an American football team that represented the University of Colorado as an independent during the 1892 college football season. The team has no head coach and compiled a record of 3–2, which marked the program's first winning season.

Schedule

References

Colorado
Colorado Buffaloes football seasons
Colorado Silver and Gold football